Enuff Z'nuff's 11th studio album, simply titled ?, is an odds and ends collection of previously unreleased studio material recorded throughout the band's career. Although a few new tracks were recorded specifically for the album, the remainder of the songs were originally recorded during the sessions of their albums Animals With Human Intelligence and Paraphernalia.  The ? album was released first in Japan, where it peaked at #177. A U.S. release followed soon after in October on Perris Records, as well as a European release on Frontiers Records in early 2005.

The band did tour during the time of release (without lead singer Donnie Vie), but songs from this album were not included in their live shows. Bassist Chip Z'Nuff did make a promotional appearance on the Howard Stern radio show, where the lead track "Gorgeous" was played on-air.

Track listing

Personnel
Donnie Vie – lead vocals, guitars and keyboards
Chip Z'Nuff – bass guitar, guitars and vocals
Derek Frigo – lead guitar
Vikki Foxx – drums

Additional personnel

Ricky Parent - Drums
Jamie - Piano, Guitar
San Francisco Fawkes - Drums
Ashley Scott - Lead Guitar (Track 11)
Kenny Harke - Drums (Track 11)
Bruce Breckenfeld - Keyboards
Gino Martino - Guitar
Kim Bullard - Keyboards

Production
Produced by Chip Z'Nuff and Donnie Vie
Mixing – Chris Steinmetz

References 

Enuff Z'nuff albums
2004 albums